KFZE (104.3 FM) is a radio station licensed to serve Daniel, Wyoming, United States. The station is currently owned by Alan and Faith Harris, through licensee Wagonwheel Communications Corporation.

References

External links

FZE
Country radio stations in the United States
Radio stations established in 2013